The 2022 Belgian Cup Final, named Croky Cup after the sponsor, was the 67th Belgian Cup final. On 2 March 2022, Gent qualified for their 6th final, losing 2 and winning 3. Anderlecht qualified one day later, reaching their fourteenth final, having won nine times before, the last time of which occurred in 2008, when they also faced Gent in the 2008 Belgian Cup Final. After a tense 0–0 draw after extra time, Gent won 4–3 on penalties.

Route to the final

Pre-match
From a personnel perspective, both clubs seemingly started in full force, as they saw several players return from injury just in time for the final. Gent recuperated captain Vadis Odjidja-Ofoe, who previously played for Anderlecht, while at Anderlecht both Sergio Gómez and Yari Verschaeren were able to start the match, while Majeed Ashimeru started on the bench as he was not deemed ready for a full match yet. Just before the match however, Gent suffered a set back as striker Laurent Depoitre got injured and was unable to play.

Looking at the results going into the match, Gent had reached the last 16 of the UEFA Europa Conference League and ended the regular season scoring 25 out of 27 points, nevertheless, despite their strong run and comeback in the league standings, they had only finished 5th, thus missing out on the Champions' Playoffs on the final matchday. Their winning streak did however include a 1-0 victory over Anderlecht in the third week of March. Anderlecht from their side had been relieved to just reach the Champions' Playoffs after finishing third in the league. The winner of the final would be assured of a place in the play-off round of the 2022–23 UEFA Europa League. In case of a loss, Gent would only be able to reach European football through winning Play-Off II and the European competition play-offs (although the latter might be canceled in case Anderlecht would qualify for the UEFA Champions League through finishing 1st or 2nd in the league). Anderlecht knew a loss in the cup final would mean they would need to finish top three in the league to be certain of European football, in case they dropped to fourth, they would however need to win the European competition play-offs.

Match

Summary
Even without their targetman Laurent Depoitre, who dropped out during the warmup, Gent started strongly as Hendrik Van Crombrugge only narrowly reached the header by Michael Ngadeu-Ngadjui in the opening minutes, after which they took control of the match. While Anderlecht was suffering, they did create a big chance, with the deviation of Yari Verschaeren rolling straight into Davy Roef. It would be their only real dangerous opportunity of the first half, with other minor chances coming through an overhead kick by Lior Refaelov, a volley by Verschaeren and a blocked shot by Kristoffer Olsson. On the other side of the pitch, Gent remained much more threatening. Tarik Tissoudali dribbled his way around Lisandro Magallán, but the latter was able to stay close, not allowing Tissoudali a clean shot on goal. Then, sloppy defending by Michael Amir Murillo gave Vadis Odjidja-Ofoe an opportunity to shoot but his attempt went just wide. Five minutes before the break, Roman Bezus seemingly opened the score, but his header on a cross by Joseph Okumu was disallowed for offside.

In the second half Gent immediately continued where it left off, through a header from Julien De Sart and a blistering shot from Vadis Odjidja-Ofoe, but they did not manage to score. Anderlecht manager Vincent Kompany tried to turn things around by bringing in Francis Amuzu, Majeed Ashimeru and Benito Raman around the hour mark to allow a more direct style of play, which indeed restored the balance of play, but did not result in any chances created. The game became more fierce, with both Ashimeru and Andrew Hjulsager having to leave the pitch injured after being substituted on earlier in the second half, and play was often stopped due to players receiving treatment. On top of this, an environmental activist had tied himself to one of the goalposts, causing a further few minutes of pause. All of this resulted in a dull second half after the initial chances.

As such, it came as a surprise when at the start of extra time the game burst open again, Núrio Fortuna missing a huge chance for Gent, heading wide, while just after that Matisse Samoise could only narrowly intercept Anouar Ait El Hadj who had broken through for Anderlecht. At that point it seemed the Anderlecht players were more energetic while Gent needed willpower to keep up, they could only breathe a sigh of relief when Christian Kouamé recklessly shot over the bar. The final chance of the match was for Gent however, as Darko Lemajić hit the underside of the bar from close range in minute 116, but the game stayed goalless. In the penalty kick sequence, Davy Roef became the hero for Gent, saving the penalty kicks by Josh Cullen and Michael Amir Murillo, while Van Crombrugge had only been able to keep out the effort of Michael Ngadeu-Ngadjui, allowing Gent to take their first trophy since their league title in 2015, while Anderlecht continued its period without silverware, last winning the 2017 Belgian Super Cup.

Details

Notes

References

External links
  

Belgian Cup finals
Cup Final
Belgian Cup Final
Sports competitions in Brussels
Belgian Cup Final
K.A.A. Gent matches
R.S.C. Anderlecht matches
Belgian Cup Final 2022